White Sands Ranch is a locale of private land in Otero County, New Mexico, near federal lands of the Tularosa Basin acquired during World War II. Part of the White Sands Ranchers of New Mexico vs. United States legal case denied additional Takings Clause remuneration, the ranch includes numerous buildings and a pond on Wsmr S Rt 250.

References

Populated places in Otero County, New Mexico
Ranches in New Mexico
Tularosa Basin